The Malegaon Municipal Corporation is the governing body of the city of Malegaon in the Indian state of Maharashtra. The municipal corporation consists of democratically elected members, is headed by a mayor and administers the city's infrastructure, public services and police. Members from the state's leading various political parties hold elected offices in the corporation. Malegaon Municipal Corporation has been formed with functions to improve the infrastructure of town. Municipal Corporation mechanism in India was introduced during British Rule with formation of municipal corporation in Madras (Chennai) in 1688, later followed by municipal corporations in Bombay (Mumbai) and Calcutta (Kolkata) by 1762.

Revenue sources 

The following are the Income sources for the corporation from the Central and State Government.

Revenue from taxes 
Following is the Tax related revenue for the corporation.

 Property tax.
 Profession tax.
 Entertainment tax.
 Grants from Central and State Government like Goods and Services Tax.
 Advertisement tax.

Revenue from non-tax sources 

Following is the Non Tax related revenue for the corporation.

 Water usage charges.
 Fees from Documentation services.
 Rent received from municipal property.
 Funds from municipal bonds.

List of Mayor

List of Deputy Mayor

List of Chairman, Standing Committee

Corporation Election 2017

Political Performance in Election 2017 
Malegaon Municipal Corporation elections were conducted in May 2017.

Corporation Election 2012

Political Performance in Election 2012

References 

Malegaon
Municipal corporations in Maharashtra
Year of establishment missing